Jeanne Socrates (born 17 August 1942) is a British yachtswoman. She is from Lymington. She holds the record as the oldest female to have circumnavigated the world single-handed, and she is the only woman to have circumnavigated solo nonstop from North America.  She was awarded the Cruising Club of America's Blue Water Medal and the Royal Cruising Club Medal for Seamanship in 2013.

On 28 September 2017, after major injuries due to a fall from a ladder while working on her yacht Nereida, a 38-foot Najad 380, she postponed a planned attempt to gain the record as the oldest circumnavigator of either sex, then held by Japanese Minoru Saitō who sailed round the world in 2005 at the age of 71.

On 3 October 2018, Socrates started on her latest attempt to circumnavigate the world singlehandedly, and was the oldest person ever to solo circumnavigate non-stop when she completed her voyage on 7 September 2019. On 22 February 2020 she lost this record when the 81-year-old Bill Hatfield completed his solo non-stop circumnavigation, but because Hatfield did not pass south of New Zealand or Tasmania, Socrates remains the oldest person to have sailed round the world "singlehandedly, unassisted and non-stop via the Five Great Capes".

In November 2019 the Greater Victoria Harbour Authority in Victoria, British Columbia, Canada, named the inner harbour commercial dock in Victoria Harbour, which typically handles a million visitors a year, as the "Jeanne Socrates Dock" in honour of her circumnavigation, which departed and arrived at that harbour.

References

External links
 Jeanne Socrates on S/V Nereida

Living people
British female sailors (sport)
Single-handed circumnavigating sailors
Blue Water Medal recipients
1942 births